A general election was held in the Northern Territory on Saturday 13 August 1977. Though the election was won by the incumbent Country Liberal Party (CLP), the party lost five of its seven executive members.  Surprisingly, one of the casualties was Majority Leader Goff Letts—one of the few instances where a major-party leader at any level in Australia lost his own seat. The election also marked the emergence of the Labor Party as a parliamentary force: Labor took six seats in the new assembly.

The Progress Party contested the elections, winning 9.76% of the primary vote across the territory, but failed to secure any assembly seats.

The Country Liberals chose Paul Everingham to succeed Letts as Majority Leader. Everingham appointed a new Executive, which included future Chief Ministers Marshall Perron and Ian Tuxworth. The following year, the Territory attained self-government.   Everingham became Chief Minister, while his Executive became a Ministry with greatly expanded powers.

Independent Dawn Lawrie retained her seat of Nightcliff at this election, while Ron Withnall lost his seat of Port Darwin to the CLP.

Retiring MPs

CLP
Eric Manuell MLA (Alice Springs)
Hyacinth Tungutalum MLA (Tiwi)

Results

|}

Candidates

Sitting members are listed in bold. Successful candidates are highlighted in the relevant colour. Where there is possible confusion, an asterisk is used.

Seats changing hands

References

See also
Everingham Executive
First Everingham Ministry
Second Everingham Ministry
Third Everingham Ministry
Fourth Everingham Ministry

Elections in the Northern Territory
1977 elections in Australia
1970s in the Northern Territory
August 1977 events in Australia